This is an order of battle listing the Australian and Japanese forces involved in the Kokoda Track campaign from 21 July – 16 November 1942.

Australian forces
 New Guinea Force (Port Moresby) – Major General Basil Morris (19 May 1941 – 31 July 1942) / Lieutenant General Sydney Rowell (1 August 1942 – 30 September 1942) / Lieutenant General Edmund Herring (1 October 1942 – 29 January 1943)
 7th Division – Major General Arthur Allen (18 April 1941 – 14 November 1942) / Major General Alan Vasey (temporary) (14 November 1942 – 23 February 1943)
 16th Brigade – Brigadier John Lloyd
 2/1st Battalion
 2/2nd Battalion
 2/3rd Battalion
 21st Brigade – Brigadier Arnold Potts / Brigadier Ivan Dougherty
 2/14th Battalion
 2/16th Battalion
 2/27th Battalion
 25th Brigade – Brigadier Kenneth Eather
 2/25th Battalion
 2/31st Battalion
 2/33rd Battalion
 30th Brigade – Brigadier Selwyn Porter
 39th Battalion
 53rd Battalion
 3rd Battalion
 2/1st Pioneer Battalion
 2/6th Independent Company
 Papuan Infantry Battalion
 14th Field Regiment, Royal Australian Artillery
 2/5th Field Company, Royal Australian Engineers 
 2/6th Field Company, Royal Australian Engineers 
 2/4th Field Ambulance, Australian Army Medical Corps
 2/6th Field Ambulance, Australian Army Medical Corps
 14th Field Ambulance, Australian Army Medical Corps
 Australian New Guinea Administrative Unit (ANGAU)

Source:

Japanese forces
 17th Army Headquarters  (Rabaul) – Lieutenant General Harukichi Hyakutake
 South Seas Force – Major General Tomitarō Horii
 55th Infantry Group Headquarters 
 144th Infantry Regiment
 1/144th Battalion
 2/144th Battalion
 3/144th Battalion
 41st Infantry Regiment
 1/41st Battalion
 2/41st Battalion
 3/41st Battalion
 3rd Company, 55th Cavalry Regiment (less one platoon), plus Pom-Pom Gun Squad
 1st Company, 55th Engineer Regiment, plus Materials Platoon (part strength)
 2nd Company, 55th Supply Regiment
 Disease Prevention and Water Supply Unit, 55th Division (part strength)
 Medical Unit, 55th Division (part strength)
 1st Field Hospital, 55th Division
 1st Battalion, 5th Mountain Artillery Regiment
 15th Independent Engineer Regiment

Source:

Notes

References

World War II  orders of battle